CBV Vietnam finance indices comprise the only index that reflects the performance of the stock market of Vietnam. They were introduced to the Vietnamese financial market by Bien Viet Securities JSC at the beginning of 2007. The Indices were founded by the Council of Corporates and Businesses of Vietnam.

Four indices
They include four subsets which track the emerging Vietnamese securities market.
CBV Equity Indices
CBV Fixed Income Indices 
CBV Strategy Indices
CBV Alternative Indices

CBV equity indices
CBV equity indices is used a branchmark to evaluate the market value of all Vietnam stock markets, Ha Noi and Ho Chi Minh City Securities Trading Centers.
CBV equity indices includes nine indices to track stock in emerging Vietnamese stock market such as: CBV Index, CBV LargeCap, CBV MidCap, CBV SmallCap, CBV Sector, CBV value, CBV Growth, CBV Companies, SANOTC/CBV index

CBV fixed income indices
CBV fixed income indices is a listing of bonds or fixed income instruments and a statistic reflecting the composite value of its components. It is used as a benchmark to evaluate the market value of all Vietnam bonds.
CBV fixed income indicesincludes five bond indices to track bonds in emerging Vietnamese bond market.
CBV Composite Index 
CBV Government Bond Index
CBV Corporate Bond Index
CBV Convertible Bond Index
CBV Interbank bond Index

CBV strategy indices
CBV strategy indices includes three indices in emerging Vietnamese securities market.  
CBV Aggressive Investment Indices
CBV Moderate Investment Indices
CBV Conservative Investment Indices

CBV alternative indices
CBV alternative indicesincludes eight indices to track in emerging Vietnamese securities market, such as: CBV Real Estate Index, CBV Hanoi real estate index, CBV HCMcity real estate index, CBV Vietnam officer index, CBV Vietnam apartment, CBV Vietnam retail index, CBV Vietnam warehouse index, CBV Vietnam commodity index.

See also
CBV Equity Indices
CBV Index
CBV MidCap
CBV SmallCap
CBV Sector
CBV Fixed Income Indices
CBV Vietnam Bond Index

External links
About Woori CBV
Overview of Vietnam Securities Index from Woori CBV
Detailed introduction about Vietnam Securities Index from Woori CBV

Finance in Vietnam